The Alpines Steinschaf is a breed of domestic sheep indigenous to the Eastern Alps of Austria and southern Germany. It is used for wool, meat and vegetation management.

Etymology

The origin and meaning of the word steinschaf is unknown, though various theories have been advanced.

History

The Alpines Steinschaf is one of four breeds in the Steinschaf group, the others being the Krainer Steinschaf, the Montafoner Steinschaf and the Tiroler Steinschaf. They are variously thought to have derived from the mediaeval Zaupelschaf type, or from the older Torfschaf, and are believed to be the oldest sheep breeds of the eastern Alps.

At the start of the twentieth century the Alpines Steinschaf was widely distributed in the eastern Alps. In Austria it was found mainly in Salzburg, but also in Carinthia, North and East Tirol and in Vorarlberg. In Germany it was common in the Bavarian districts of Berchtesgaden and  Traunstein and in the south-east part of Rosenheim. In Italy it was present in the Eisacktal, the Passeiertal, the upper Pustertal and in the upper Vinschgau, in the autonomous province of Bolzano; by 1964 the population in this area had fallen to below 1000 head.

In 2009 the Alpines Steinschaf was named "endangered livestock breed of the year" by the German Gesellschaft zur Erhaltung alter und gefährdeter Haustierrassen, a national association for the conservation of historic and endangered breeds of domestic animals. In 2014, it was listed as "extremely endangered" on the red list of endangered animal breeds of the GEH.

A total population of 491–650 was reported by Austria in 2012; Germany reported 791 head in 2013.

Characteristics

The Alpines Steinschaf is a fine-boned mountain breed of small to medium size. Rams weigh , and ewes . All coat colours are found. The face and lower legs are without wool; the legs are thin but strong, and the hooves hard. Rams are often horned, ewes less often so. The ears are carried horizontally or slightly drooping. The face and ears may be marked with black.

References

Sheep breeds originating in Austria
Sheep breeds originating in Germany
Animal breeds on the GEH Red List